Sulima is a Polish coat of arms. It was used by several szlachta families in the Kingdom of Poland and the Polish–Lithuanian Commonwealth. Among its most notable users were Zawisza Czarny (a famous Polish knight) and the Sułkowski family.

Description

The coat of arms consists of a shield split horizontally into two regions, most commonly using the colors of red and yellow. The bottom region is usually depicted as red (rarely blue) with three white stones or crosses adorning it. The top region is depicted as yellow (sometimes described as gold) or less commonly white (also described as silver), adorned with the top half of a right-facing eagle with its wings outstretched. More ornate depictions of the coat of arms include various mantling, for example a helmet on top of the shield, and a further eagle on top of the helmet.

Variations used by individual families may change the color scheme, use a different eagle, or otherwise incorporate the entire design as part of a larger coat of arms.

History

The earliest recorded uses of the Sulima coat of arms are found on three wax seals attached to documents from 1352 and around 1360. One of them was owned by the curator of the collegiate church of St. Michael's Castle - Francis. In its initial form the coat of arms consisted of only the undivided shield. The colors from this period are unknown.

Among several images of the seal from the 14th century the most note-worthy is the seal of Stanisław Gamrat from Klimontów impressed under the act of Union of Horodło in 1413.

Around the same time Sulima was used by Zawisza Czarny. Fighting with the Turks and performing various missions at the side of king Sigismund, perhaps in reference to the emblem of Germany, he gave the eagle in his coat of arms black color (a cognomen Czarny means "black" in Polish). Associated with the figure of Zawisza is also the first colored version of Sulima. It ended up in St. Christophers Fraternal Book on Arlberg in Tyrol (pol. Księga bracka św. Krzysztofa na Arlbergu w Tyrolu) as a donation to the fraternity for caring for travellers crossing Alps. The arms of the eagle, the top field, and an added girdle on the eagle were silver. Bottom field was red with golden stones in a 2 and 1 distribution. Presumably the Western illustrator was inspired by the eagles of Silesia (girdle and color), Germany (color) and Poland (color of the field).

In the 15th century appearances Sulima was featured in three Western rolls of arms. The most famous of these is the Burgundian Armorial Toison d'Or by Jean Le Fèvre de Saint-Remy from around 1435. Armorial repeats the color scheme of the familiar Fraternal Book, but the upper field is thinner, coming closer to a third of the shield instead of the usual half. That version lacks any jewels or mantling. Two other Western armorials Codex Bergshammar and Armorial Lycenich from 1420s/30s, publish a similar image, also shrinking the top field.

At the same time in Poland images of Sulima have already had a clear division into two fields. An example of this are the seals of Władysław from Oporów, bishop of Wrocław in the years 1435-1441. Images in the same style were also preserved at the castle in Oporów.

An interesting variant of the look comes from the decoration of the reliquary of St. Barbara from the years 1484-1493. The shield alongside the already established division has an additional element in the form of decorative fringes, the emblem is red, and the field is gold.

Subsequent elements of the full coat of arms next to labrów and jewel, appeared on the bell of the Dmosin and, dating back to 1,500 years, the foundation of a family member Oporowski. It is worth noting that this is the first presentation of Sulima labrami and the jewel in Poland. Additionally, the helmet had a crown.

The first performance Sulima with a top field gold comes from the portrait of Peter Gamrat from the years 1541-1545. Here, however, the top field more like a head. Division two-pole and gold upper field shows while so-called. Herbal Arsenalski from about 1535 to 1555. In addition, the stones are all silver. Although silver tincture upper field appears even in the sixteenth century, but it can be assumed that the tincture of gold then became dominant. Much of the merits of a new compendium of heraldic from 1584 - Herby rycerstwa polskiego by Bartosz Paprocki. It shows the image of the coat of arms full, but does not identify the color of stones. In addition, due to an engraver's error, eagle jewel and emblem is facing to the left, which was replicated in later times.

Moreover, this coat of arms is found on several gothic tombstones, among others in Gniezno and Koło, as an architectural detail in several churches and in a castle in Oporów near Kutno, as well as a symbol of the founders of the various ecclesiastical jewels - precious chalice, books.

Decline of fourteenth century brought in the first written mention of the coat of arms Sulima. In 1397, the name of the family and the coat of arms appeared in court records Łęczyca voivodeship (record de cleynodio Sulima). For the same year it comes the first mention of a kindred Sulimów in court records Konin. Since then repeatedly scrolled in various writings heraldic, sometimes with a terse description of the coat of arms in Latin or Polish, for example. Pol Horla and trzi kamene (1423)  eagle with three stones  (1568 year), or three stones s pools eagle v black box (1580). Particularly noteworthy so far unexplained mention of the black box. Perhaps it is a closer vague variation.

Description Sulima was also the first Polish armorial - Gem attributed to Jan Długosz with 60s fifteenth century. Dlugosz describes the coat of arms without the distribution of the field. It is possible that simply omitted this detail description, or based on older depictions.

The earliest mention of proklamie, which is identical with the name of the coat of arms comes from 1424.

According to Maria Kowalska Bobowski-name coat of arms comes from the personal name (name) Sulima, Sulim (from 1394 is present in the sources Sulima with erysipelas, undoubtedly a member of this family).

For reliable can be regarded as hypothesis Wladyslaw Semkowicz derived the name of Sulima (such as topographic) from the village of nest Sulimów in Wielkopolska Sulina under Kleck in the district of Gniezno, parish Dębnica. Another village with a similar name - Sulimów (now Sulmów) was in the district of Sieradz, parish Goszczanów. It is known from written sources until 1391. And far away, geographically, from Łęczyca goods of different families of the arms known from a later period. Not too far away, but from here (about 30 km in a straight line) to Sieradz Ostrowska near Uniejów - the village associated with Sulimami already in 13th in.

Unlikely it seems to be another hypothesis derived from the name of the family Sulimów kind of medieval polearms - sulicy.

Black eagle as a symbol of strength was the emblem of the Roman emperors and German.

According to legend, given by Leopold von Ledebur progenitor Sulimitów was added to the coat of arms of three precious stones to show the community of blood with his two brothers, from whom he had to distinguish by name and emblem.

Jan Dlugosz hypothesized repeated later by other heralds (Paprocki, Bielski, Okolski, Niesiecki), allegedly Sulimczycy were knights migrant from Germany. Would testify about the black eagle, allegedly referring to the heraldry of kings and emperors of the Reich. Niesiecki even gives an example of Prussian family Slomff that in one of the fields czterodzielnego coat of arms was half black eagle and writes about them as relatives Sulimczyków. This hypothesis, however, is today called into question by some historians: it is not meet so.  Criterion imino , which clearly shows that the names of the earliest mentioned Sulimitów were purely Polish (e.g. Strzeszko, Budzisław, Wierzchosław).

This article has been prepared on the basis of reliable sources, especially classical and contemporary armorials. However, you should pay attention to the frequent occurrence of assigning the wrong families of noble coats of arms, especially intensified during legitimacy nobility against offensive Herold me, which was then fixed in turn issued armorials. The identity of the names does not mean belonging to the family coat of arms. Membership in the can clearly determine only study genealogy.

The list of names contained in the article (in infoboksie right) comes from "Herbarium Polish" 'Tadeusz Gajl. This is so far the most comprehensive list of herbownych, constantly replenished by the author of the new editions of Herbarium. Occurrence on the list of names does not necessarily mean that a particular family sealed the coat of arms Sulima. Often, the same names are the property of many families representing all the states of the former Republic, i.e. The peasants, burghers, nobility.

Some of the common names there are for families of assumed to coat the road adoption. The first (not counting Rodywiła) documented an adopted (year 1506) was a councilor Jan Baytel (Beutel) of Toruń. In 1522 Sulimitą became Stanislaw Vitreator (Glazier - Szklarzewski), while four years later - Fedor Dawiłowicz of Vitsyebsk and children and brothers - Saul Emanuel and Jerzy Zylajewiczami. They were adopted by Peter and John Służewski Gamrat. With the adoption came a coat of Felix of Trynczy 1540, but it made the gem varieties (see variant versions aristocratic and alternative representations of the coat of arms). New Sulimitów admitted to the family until the end of the First Republic. Anthony, Christopher and Valentine Deymów knighted and given Sulima 1768 George Trublajewicza year later, and Melchior, Gaspar and John Szajowskich (Szajewskich) in 1776.

Sulima was used by several families of foreign origin, including Tatar and Armenian.

Stanislaw Dziadulewicz lists Tartar origin family kniaziowską Ułanowiczów (who have come from Jasiek Kazkowicza an older line of princes Kryczyńskich; name is the name of the village Ułanowicze had taken in the period 1640-1650 Adam). He mentioned, too, that in 1819 Ignatius Ułanowicz Sulima (who wrote the Ullanowicz and using the nickname "on Solms') filed an application to the Senate of the Polish Kingdom to grant him the title of earl because of that his father in various transactions, the official took the title and that was registered even in metric as Count. The Commission of the Senate in 1824, evidence recognized and awarded it. Zablocki name as the name of a family of Tatar origin lists service  Polish Tartars .

Armenian origin by Louis Corvinus was supposed to be a family Jaśkiewiczów. With this family were to be among others: Jan - court physician of King Stanisław August Poniatowski, Jagiellonian University professor, Joseph - the judge rights of Armenian in Lviv 1765, king's secretary, Gabriel and Francis Xavier - secretaries of the king.

It is worth mentioning published in 1855 a book of Russian heraldry Alexander Borisovich varnish "Heraldry Russian". The author cites the names there of the Russian nobility, which took over some of the Polish coat of arms. Among them is Sulima. The paint does not explain how such a takeover occurred. What is certain is that few Polish families settled in Russia. Native Russian families could receive the Polish coats of arms on the principle of assimilation images of their own. Coat of arms Sulima had the varnish to seal the family: Bantysz-Kamienski, Guriew and Sabłukow (of unspecified variety). Herb Sulima, as one of the 271 Polish nobility coats of arms has been absorbed by the Russian heraldry.

Origin and occurrence coat

The earliest mention of evolution and the image of the coat of arms 

Notable bearers of this coat of arms include:

Zawisza Czarny
Władysław Oporowski 
Igor Stravinsky
Piotr Gamrat
Popiel family
Sułkowski family
Radomski family
Felix Dzerzhinsky

Gallery

External links 
  Sulima Coat of Arms and bearers.

Notes

References

See also
 Polish heraldry
 Heraldry
 Coat of arms

Polish coats of arms
Polish heraldry